An open golf tournament usually refers to a golf tournament in which all golfers are eligible to play regardless of their professional or amateur status. Often there will be certain restrictions, commonly based on ability. Some amateur-only tournaments are also described as open, although by definition professional golfers are excluded.

History
The descriptor open is used in a number of sports, and especially in golf, to describe a tournament that is "open" — in theory to all — rather than being closed, i.e. one that is restricted to a particular group. Thus, an amateur tournament, e.g. the U.S. Amateur, is not by definition "open", because it is closed to professional golfers; however many are titled as such since they are open to all amateurs, e.g. the English Men's Open Amateur Stroke Play Championship for the Brabazon Trophy.  The first precise usage of the adjective “open” in golf was in 1861 when the Prestwick Golf Club "opened" its Medal competition (launched the previous year for professionals only) to amateurs as well; ever since, The Open Championship has been open to all. Any golfer can, in theory, play in The Open either by invitation or by various forms of qualification. In practice, the event is a professional tournament in which a small number of the world’s leading amateurs also play, by invitation or qualification. 

Over time the descriptor "open" has been extended to include the premier national tournaments of many countries (starting with the U.S. Open in 1895) and also (mainly in the United States) to some other tournaments, e.g. the Buick Open.

Principal national "Opens"
This is a list of the national Opens that have featured on the principal tours.

Men's tournaments

Women's tournaments

References

Golf terminology